Susana Seivane is the eponymous debut album by Galician gaita (bagpipes) player Susana Seivane, released in 1999.

History
The album has a wide diversity of time-signatures. The arrangements are done by Rodrigo Romani of Milladoiro, Brais Maceiras and Seivane. This is her most traditional album till now, with no rock elements, and many traditional songs.

Seivane sang two songs (tracks 5 and 12) the first solo, the second with Sonia Lebedynski, sung in Galician. The liner notes contain a photograph of her playing bagpipes in a procession in folk costume at the age of three. From a technical point of view "Xota dos 28 puntos" has the most complex playing technique. The liner notes are in Spanish and English.

Reception

Music critic Peggy Latkovich wrote in her Allmusic review "... her playing is confident with a fine rhythmic sweep. The simple arrangements, though a bit dry at times, keep the spotlight on her performance. Since the nasal moan of Galician pipes is an acquired taste for many, this can be seen as a plus or a minus... There's a good variety of tune types, from traditional jotas (dance tunes) to newly composed waltzes and rumbas... Seivane shows a lot of promise. It will be interesting to watch her develop as an artist."

Track listing
"Jotabe" (Melo Suarez) 
"Taramundi/ Alen" (Traditional, Suarez) 
"Xota de Ninodaguia/Muineira do Muino de Peizas/Polca para Erica" (Beito Romero, Raul #Galego, Anton Varela) 
"Pasacorredoiras de Ponteareas" (Traditional) 
"Alala de Vilalba" (Lyrics: Traditional/Music: Rodrigo Romani)
"Sabelina" (Seivane) 
"Marcha procesional dos Mato" (Unknown) 
"Fonsagrada" (Traditional) 
"Xota dos 28 puntos" (Traditional) 
"Maneo (song)" (Unknown) 
"A cotula" (Unknown) 
"Savinao/Pasodoble de Pousada" (Traditional) 
"3 Muineiras (do Vello Rilo/de Manuel do Pazo/de Ambite)" (Traditional)

Personnel
Susana Seivane – bagpipes in B, bagpipes in C, djembe, drum, tambourine, darbuka, vocals
Brais Maceiras – diatonic accordion, tin whistle
Rodrigo Romani – bouzouki, acoustic guitar, zither, ocarina, keyboards, marinba
Kim Garcia – bass guitar, double bass
Beto Niebla – drum
Anxo Pintos – zanfona/hurdy-gurdy
Laura Quintilan – violin
Xose Luz – traverse flute
Xose Ferreiros – oboe, bodhran, rattles
Sonia Lebedynski – vocals

References

1999 debut albums
Susana Seivane albums